Inuvik  (place of man) is the only town in the Inuvik Region, and the third largest community in Canada's Northwest Territories. Located in what is sometimes called the Beaufort Delta Region, it serves as its administrative and service centre and is home to federal, territorial, and Indigenous government offices, along with the regional hospital and airport.

Inuvik is located on the northern edge of the boreal forest, just before it begins to transition to tundra, and along the east side of the enormous Mackenzie River delta. The town lies on the border between the Gwich'in Settlement Region and the Inuvialuit Settlement Region.

History 
Inuvik was conceived in 1953 as a replacement administrative centre for the hamlet of Aklavik on the west of the Mackenzie Delta, as the latter was prone to flooding and had no room for expansion. Initially called "New Aklavik", it was renamed Inuvik in 1958. The school was built in 1959 and the hospital, government offices and staff residences in 1960, when people, including Inuvialuit, Gwichʼin (Dene) and Métis, began to live in the community.

Naval Radio Station (NRS) Inuvik, later CFS Inuvik, callsign CFV, was commissioned on 10 September 1963 after operations had been successfully transferred from NRS Aklavik. Station CFV was part of the SUPRAD (Supplementary Radio) network of intercept and direction finding stations.

CFS Inuvik closed on 1 April 1986 and the site was transferred to the Department of Transport for use as a telecommunications station. Nothing remains of CFS Inuvik today. The Navy Operations base at the end of Navy Road was completely dismantled and removed.

Inuvik achieved village status in 1967 and became a full town in 1979 with an elected mayor and council. In 1979, with the completion of the Dempster Highway, Inuvik became connected to Canada's highway system, and simultaneously the most northerly town to which one could drive in Canada. While a winter only ice road through the Mackenzie River delta still connects Inuvik to Aklavik, southwest of Inuvik, the Tuktoyaktuk Winter Road, which ran northeast to Tuktoyaktuk, is no longer being built due to the opening in November 2017, of the Inuvik–Tuktoyaktuk Highway (ITH), which is open all year round. The Inuvik to Tuktoyaktuk highway, which connects to Canada's highway system at Inuvik via the Dempster Highway, is the first road in history to reach the Arctic Ocean in North America.

Between 1971 and 1990, the town's economy was supported by the local Canadian Armed Forces Station, CFS Inuvik, (originally a Naval Radio Station, later a communications research/signals intercept facility) and by petrochemical companies exploring the Mackenzie Valley and the Beaufort Sea for petroleum. This all collapsed in 1990 for a variety of reasons, including disappearing government military subsidies, local resistance to petroleum exploration, and low international oil prices. Since then the economy has been based on some minor tourism and subsidy provided by the Crown–Indigenous Relations and Northern Affairs Canada (INAC), Health Canada (for the regional hospital) and the Royal Canadian Mounted Police.

Demographics 

As of the 2021 Canadian census there were 1,990 people who identified as Indigenous. Of these 63.6 per cent were Inuvialuit (Inuit, predominantly Uummarmiut), 26.1 per cent First Nations, 5.8 per cent Métis and 4.8 per cent reported other Indigenous heritage. The non-Indigenous population of Inuvik was 36.6 per cent. The main language spoken in Inuvik is English, though schools teach and a handful of local people still speak Inuinnaqtun (Inuvialuktun), and Gwichʼin. Local CBC Radio, CHAK (AM), broadcasts an hour of programming a day in each of these languages. Local Gwichʼin are enrolled in the Inuvik Native Band.

There are also about 100 Muslims, most of whom came there for economic opportunities. A small mosque (dubbed "Little mosque on the tundra" in reference to the CBC show Little Mosque on the Prairie) was established in 2010.

Geography 

The tree line lies north of Inuvik, and the town is surrounded by boreal forest.

Due to its northern location, Inuvik experiences an average of 56 days of midnight sun every summer and 30 days of polar night every winter.

Transportation

Road
Until November 2017, Inuvik was the most northern community in Canada to be accessible by road (now second to Tuktoyaktuk). The  Dempster Highway links Inuvik to the rest of Canada, providing relatively easy access to a wide variety of goods, and greatly reducing their cost. In contrast, many Arctic communities depend on cargo flights for regular goods and summer sealifts for larger freight, making goods expensive and often slow to arrive.
In 2017, the Inuvik–Tuktoyaktuk Highway was extended north from Inuvik another  to Tuktoyaktuk on the Arctic coast. Inuvik is also connected to Aklavik by an ice road across the Mackenzie Delta from late December until late April each year.

The Dempster Highway relies on ferries to cross the Peel River near Fort McPherson and the Mackenzie River at Tsiigehtchic during the summer months. In winter, ice bridges are constructed to cross the rivers. During the spring the crossings close throughout May as the ice on the rivers breaks up. Similarly, they are impassible for most of November while the rivers freeze.
During these times air travel is the only way for people and goods to reach Inuvik.

Air
The Inuvik (Mike Zubko) Airport is serviced by several regional carriers. Canadian North has regular direct flights to Yellowknife and Norman Wells. It further connects to Edmonton, and a number of smaller communities in the Northwest Territories and Nunavut.
Air North connects to points in the Yukon and travels as far south as Vancouver.
Aklak Air flies north to the small communities of Sachs Harbour, Paulatuk, and Ulukhaktok.
Freight services, helicopters, and floatplane charters are also available from Inuvik. Floatplane service operates out of the nearby Inuvik/Shell Lake Water Aerodrome.

Water
When the Mackenzie River is ice-free, Marine Transportation Services provides a commercial barge service from Hay River, on Great Slave Lake to the regional terminal in Inuvik. The annual sealift moves supplies east into the Kitikmeot Region of Nunavut and west to Utqiagvik, Alaska.
Many locals own small boats with outboard motors which are used to access family hunting and fishing camps or to visit Aklavik. Boat traffic comes to a halt in the winter when the Mackenzie River freezes.

Climate
Inuvik has a subarctic climate (Köppen Dfc). Summers are typically wetter and cool, with temperatures varying wildly throughout the months due to its peculiar location near the cold Arctic Ocean. Unlike many other North American continental climates, Inuvik warms up very quickly during the months of May and June due to the rapidly increasing day length, and that remaining snow cools down until May. June is a warmer month than August. Freezing temperatures can occur any month of the year. Inuvik has a great variation of temperatures during the year, usually peaking below  in the winter and above  in the summer.

Snow that falls from October onward usually stays until the spring thaw in mid-May.

Tourism

Famous attractions 

Inuvik's Our Lady of Victory Church, often called Igloo Church, is a famous landmark in the region. It is the most-photographed building in the town .

Inuvik has the Midnight Sun Mosque, North America's northernmost, which opened in November 2010 after being built in Winnipeg and moved  by truck and barge. Some media reports have mistakenly called the mosque "the world's northernmost mosque", but in fact mosques in Norilsk, Russia, and Tromsø, Norway, are both slightly further north than Inuvik.

Annual events of note 

The Great Northern Arts Festival has been held annually for 10 days in the middle of July since 1989. The Festival has hosted over 3,000 artists from across Canada's north, and from as far away as Japan and Australia over 31 years and is the largest annual tourism event in the Beaufort Delta. Featuring on-site demonstrations, 50+ arts workshops, a 3,500-piece gallery, an outdoor carving village, an interactive artist studio zone, nightly cultural performances, northern film screenings, family activities and an Arctic fashion show, the Festival attracts visitors from around the world to travel the Dempster Highway to visit Inuvik and the Gwich'in and Inuvialuit Settlement Regions.

The annual Sunrise Festival happens on the second weekend of the new year, when the sun finally breaks the horizon after about thirty days of polar night. The Festival is an all-day community event highlighted by dog sled races, a long-program fireworks show and community bonfire. This Festival was highlighted in the award-winning 2010 national Tropicana Orange Juice commercial Arctic Sun.

Inuvik celebrates the Muskrat Jamboree each year in late March or early April. Started in 1957, the event brings together thousands of people to participate in traditional games, watch the dog sled and snowmobile races and dance (jig) the night away in town. Most events are held on the Mackenzie River where several community groups operate concessions in stove-heated traditional McPherson tents, preparing hot soup, bannock, baked goods, coffee, Labrador tea, hot chocolate and other traditional refreshments. Many participants and spectators wear traditional clothing and often local artisans will have something to sell. In conjunction with the Muskrat Jamboree, the Town of Inuvik hosts the annual Muskrat Cup 3-on-3 Pond Hockey Tournament on the frozen Mackenzie River, the world's most northerly cash tournament.

The weekend closest to the summer solstice (21 June) each year features the Midnight Sun Fun Run, a 5K, 10K and half marathon that starts at midnight under the 24-hours of sunlight experienced for over 50 days each summer in Inuvik. Runners from around the world make their way north to participate in this unique event under the midnight sun.

Facilities

A new hospital opened in early 2003, providing service to an area extending from Sachs Harbour on Banks Island, to Ulukhaktok on Victoria Island, and from Paulatuk into the Sahtu Region including Norman Wells, Tulita, Délı̨nę, Fort Good Hope, and Colville Lake.

The Midnight Sun Complex, a stage-built multi-use facility, was completed in 2006. Featuring the Roy 'Sugloo' Ipana Memorial Arena, with an NHL-sized ice surface; the Inuvik Curling Club with three sheets and a well-situated licensed lounge/viewing area; the Inuvik Pool, an award-winning Class B recreational pool with lane swimming, waterpark features including a two-story waterslide, hot tub, sauna and steam room; two squash courts; a multi-use community hall with stage; on-site business centre/production office; full building wireless; video-conferencing facility; on-site catering/kitchen; and meeting rooms for groups of 5 to 500. At full-building use, the Complex can host conferences, conventions and trade shows with up to 1200 delegates/exhibitors.

The community has a state-of-the-art school called East 3. The construction budget for the school exceeded $110 million, and it features modern technologies such as 'smartboards' and videoconferencing facilities as well as a large gym.

A distinct feature of Inuvik is the use of "utilidors" – above-ground utility conduits carrying water and sewage – which are covered by corrugated steel. They run throughout town connecting most buildings, and as a result there are many small bridges and underpasses. The utilidors are necessary because of the permafrost underlying the town.

Media

Print
The town is served by the Inuvik Drum, a community newspaper published weekly by Northern News Services.

Television

Inuvik was previously served by CHAK-TV, VHF channel 6, a CBC North television repeater of CFYK-DT (Yellowknife); that station closed down on 31 July 2012 due to budget cuts affecting the CBC.

Radio

Communications
Landline telephone service is provided by Northwestel, and cellular service by Ice Wireless and Arctic Digital (Bell Mobility). Cable television is also offered in Inuvik by New North Networks.

Fibre optic communications were added in Inuvik in June 2017 with the completion of the Mackenzie Valley Fibre Link; the $82 million  line adds new capability to the town.

However, the dependence on this single trunk line occasionally causes widespread Internet outages during Dempster or Alaska Highway maintenance or construction. A backup trunk line between Fort Simpson and Inuvik is currently under construction.

Planetary nomenclature 

In 1988, the International Astronomical Union's Working Group for Planetary System Nomenclature (IAU/WGPSN) officially adopted the name Inuvik for a crater on Mars, at 78.7° north latitude and 28.6° west longitude.

Notable people
Leona Aglukkaq, former member of Parliament for the electoral district of Nunavut and former Minister of Health
Roger Allen, former member of the Legislative Assembly of the Northwest Territories and Olympian
Zac Boyer, former National Hockey League right winger
Tom Butters, former member of the Legislative Assembly of the Northwest Territories
Jason Elliott, former professional ice hockey player
Fred Koe, former member of the Legislative Assembly of the Northwest Territories
Floyd Roland, former Mayor of Inuvik and former Premier and member of the Legislative Assembly of the Northwest Territories
Richard Nerysoo, former chief of the Gwich'in Tribal Council, former member of the Legislative Assembly of the Northwest Territories, former Speaker of the Legislative Assembly of the Northwest Territories, and former Premier of the Northwest Territories
 Eric Schweig, Inuvialuit / Chippewa / Dene actor

See also
 List of municipalities in the Northwest Territories
 Vertical distribution of ice in Arctic clouds

References

External links

 Town of Inuvik Web Site

 
Inuit in the Northwest Territories
Towns in the Northwest Territories